Hypocryphalus is a genus of typical bark beetles in the family Curculionidae. There are more than 70 described species in Hypocryphalus.

Species
These 74 species belong to the genus Hypocryphalus:

 Hypocryphalus aciculatus Schedl
 Hypocryphalus afiamalus Schedl
 Hypocryphalus africanus Schedl (Eggers in), 1952c
 Hypocryphalus angustior Wood & Bright, 1992
 Hypocryphalus areccae (Hornung, 1842)
 Hypocryphalus asper Wood & Bright, 1992
 Hypocryphalus bakeri Wood & Bright, 1992
 Hypocryphalus basihirtus Wood & Bright, 1992
 Hypocryphalus bidentatus Browne, 1980b
 Hypocryphalus birmanus (Eichhoff, 1879)
 Hypocryphalus brevior Schedl, 1943b
 Hypocryphalus caplandicus Schedl, 1965h
 Hypocryphalus constrictus Schedl, 1942d
 Hypocryphalus corpulentus Schedl, 1942d
 Hypocryphalus crudiae Panzer, 1771
 Hypocryphalus cylindripennis Schedl, 1959a
 Hypocryphalus cylindrus Wood & Bright, 1992
 Hypocryphalus densepilosus Schedl, 1942d
 Hypocryphalus dipterocarpae Beeson, 1938
 Hypocryphalus discrepans Schedl, 1965c
 Hypocryphalus dubiosus Schedl, 1970h
 Hypocryphalus eruditus Westwood, 1935
 Hypocryphalus farinosa Blandford, 1896
 Hypocryphalus fici Browne, 1986a
 Hypocryphalus formosanus Schedl, 1952c
 Hypocryphalus froggatti Nunberg, 1961b
 Hypocryphalus ghanaensis Schedl, 1962h
 Hypocryphalus glabratus Schedl, 1959a
 Hypocryphalus granulatus Schedl, 1942a
 Hypocryphalus griseus Blackburn, 1885
 Hypocryphalus imitans Schedl
 Hypocryphalus interponens Schedl, 1953b
 Hypocryphalus javanus Eggers, 1909
 Hypocryphalus kalambanganus Schedl, 1943b
 Hypocryphalus laevis Browne, 1980a
 Hypocryphalus laticollis Beaver, 1991
 Hypocryphalus longipennis Brockerhoff, Knizek & Bain, 2003
 Hypocryphalus longipilis Browne, 1981a
 Hypocryphalus maculatus Browne, 1961a
 Hypocryphalus malayensis Schedl, 1942a
 Hypocryphalus mangiferae (Stebbing, 1914) (mango bark beetle)
 Hypocryphalus mauiensis Schedl, 1941
 Hypocryphalus mindoroensis Schedl, 1943b
 Hypocryphalus minor Schedl, 1943b
 Hypocryphalus minutus Browne, 1980d
 Hypocryphalus mollis Bright & Skidmore, 1997
 Hypocryphalus montanus Schedl, 1974d
 Hypocryphalus moorei Schedl
 Hypocryphalus nigrosetosus Schedl
 Hypocryphalus nitidicollis Schedl
 Hypocryphalus obscurus (Fabricius, 1792)
 Hypocryphalus opacus Schedl, 1942d
 Hypocryphalus ovalicollis Schedl, 1942c
 Hypocryphalus parallelus (Hopkins, 1915)
 Hypocryphalus perminimus Schedl
 Hypocryphalus pilifer Schedl
 Hypocryphalus piliger Schedl
 Hypocryphalus polynesiae Schedl
 Hypocryphalus pubescens Hopkins, 1915
 Hypocryphalus pulverulentus Hopkins, 1915
 Hypocryphalus reflexus Browne, 1980b
 Hypocryphalus rotundus Hopkins, 1915b
 Hypocryphalus ruficeps Perkins, 1900
 Hypocryphalus sandakanensis Wood & Bright, 1992
 Hypocryphalus scabricollis Eichhoff
 Hypocryphalus seriatus (Eichhoff, 1871)
 Hypocryphalus setulosum Schedl (Eggers in), 1963j
 Hypocryphalus spathulatus Schedl
 Hypocryphalus striatus Hopkins, 1915b
 Hypocryphalus sumatranus Wood & Bright, 1992
 Hypocryphalus tongaensis Schedl
 Hypocryphalus triangularis Schedl
 Hypocryphalus tutuilaensis Schedl
 Hypocryphalus vulgaris (Schaufuss, 1897)

References

Further reading

 
 
 

Scolytinae
Articles created by Qbugbot